Hayley Barr (born April 27, 1971) is an American actress.

Hayley is known for several soap opera roles and as playing herself in Looking for Richard. She has had three (3) Soap Opera Digest award nominations in 1991, 1992, and 1993.

Filmography

References

1971 births
Living people
American soap opera actresses
Place of birth missing (living people)
21st-century American women